Miami County Courthouse is a historic courthouse located at Peru, Miami County, Indiana.  It was built between 1908 and 1910, and is a three-story, steel frame, concrete, and brick building sheathed in a veneer of Bedford limestone.  It features a projecting portico with freestanding two-story Tuscan order columns in the Classical Revival.  The building has a flat roof topped by a squat four-sided square dome. The property includes an additional 33 contributing object such as a bell with stand, "Lady Liberty" statue (commonly known by many as "Statue of liberty"), retaining wall, 12 architectural lamps, and 6 street lamps.

It was listed on the National Register of Historic Places in 2008.

References

County courthouses in Indiana
Courthouses on the National Register of Historic Places in Indiana
Government buildings completed in 1910
Neoclassical architecture in Indiana
Buildings and structures in Miami County, Indiana
National Register of Historic Places in Miami County, Indiana